Javokhir Sindarov (born 8 December 2005) is an Uzbek chess prodigy. He earned the title of grandmaster in October 2018, at the age of 12 years, 10 months and 5 days.

Chess career
Sindarov was awarded the International Master title in October 2017. He achieved his first grandmaster (GM) norm at the Alekhine Memorial in June 2018. He achieved the second at the World Junior Chess Championship in September, improving his rating to 2500 in the process. In October 2018, he scored his third GM norm at the First Saturday tournament, becoming the second-youngest grandmaster in history at the time. The title was awarded by FIDE in March 2019.

He qualified for the Chess World Cup 2021. Ranked 121st, he caused a major upset by defeating 8th-ranked Alireza Firouzja in tiebreaks in the second round, and made it to the final 32 before being knocked out in the fourth round by Kacper Piorun.

References

External links

Living people
2005 births
Chess grandmasters
Uzbekistani chess players
21st-century Uzbekistani people